Manoj Datta is  an Indian engineer specialized in geotechnical engineering, foundation engineering, ground engineering, earth dams, landfill engineering and geoenvironmental engineering. He was the Director of Punjab Engineering College University of Technology and Chairperson, Organizing Committee of 6th International Congress on Environmental Geotechnics,.  He was also held the office of Dean (Alumni & International Programmes) at Indian Institute of Technology Delhi (2004–2007) and retains his lien as Professor of Civil Engineering at the same institute.

Awards
 Director’s Silver Medal at I.I.T. Delhi for being first amongst Civil Engineering Students Graduating in 1977.
 Indian Geo technical Society – ONGC best paper award (1986)
 Indian Geo technical Society – ONGC best paper award (1989)
 Indian Geo technical Society  – AIMIL best paper award (1990)
 Indian Geo technical Society – ONGC best paper award (1993)
 Indian Geo technical Society – Prof. Dinesh Mohan best paper award  (1996)
 Indian Geo technical Society (Delhi chapter) - Leadership Award (2008)

Publications
 Raju, V.S., Datta, M., Seshadri, V., and Agarwal, V.K. (1996) (Eds.), "Ash Ponds and Ash Disposal Systems", Narosa Publishers, Delhi,424 pages.
 Datta, M. (1997) (Ed.), "Waste Disposal in Engineered Landfills", Narosa Publishers, Delhi, 231 pages.
 Datta, M., Parida, B.P., Guha, B.K. and Sreekrishnan, T., (1999) (Eds.), "Industrial Solid Waste Management and Landfilling Practice", Narosa Publishers, Delhi, 204 pages.
 Gulhati, S.K. and Datta, M (2005), Geotechnical Engineering, Tata Mcgraw Hill, Delhi, 738 pages

Datta also published over 101 papers (including 21 in journals, 33 in International Conferences and 47 in National Conferences and Seminars)

References

Engineers from Punjab, India
Living people
Geotechnical engineers
Year of birth missing (living people)